Mysore North is a cluster of suburbs in the northern side of Mysore. City is divided as Northern and Southern clusters or blocks for administration Mysore North hosts separate Zone for many Government offices like Block Educational Officer (Education department), Sub-Registrar’s Office (Revenue department) and many other departments.

Northern suburbs of Mysore
 R. S. Naidu Nagar
 Kanteerava Narasimharaja Pura
 Karunapura
 Hebbal
 Mandi Mohalla
 Udayagiri
 Rajeev Nagar
 Rajendranagar
 Gokulam
 Gayathripuram
Bamboo Bazar
 Bannimantap
  Kesare
 Hale Kesare
 Hanumanthanagar
Vijayanagar
Jayalakshmipuram
Yelwal

Landmarks 
 Bannimantap Parade Grounds
 Dufferin Clock Tower
 St. Philomena's Cathedral
 St. Philomena's College
 Visvesvaraya Circle

Bus Station
The bus station located in R. S. Naidu Nagar was renovated and expanded by KSRTC as an initiative by JNNURM. Bus stand hosts amenities and services for the passengers like ATMs, India Post outlet and dedicated store for payment of Payment Centers

Infant Jesus Church
A campus by name Pushpashrama is located in R. S. Naidu Nagar with close proximity to the Naidu Nagar Bus station. This area claims to host a Shrine which is believed to have constructed the structure resembling the Maharaja's Palace. A grand Gateway (30 feet high and 20 feet wide) is located at the entrance. A Grotto is located right to the Gateway and famous for its architecture. A Church with Octagonal base shape is located in Pushpashrama. The Church hosts special prayers during Christmas and will be decorated, illuminated for the special occasion. Cake mixing ceremonies and other Christmas related celebrations on Christmas day and several initiatives will be taken up at the venue.

Image gallery

See also
 Hebbal
 Mandi Mohalla
 St. Philomena's Cathedral, Mysore
 Hale Kesare, village near R. S. Naidu Nagar
 Hanumanthanagar

References

Suburbs of Mysore
Mysore North